Operation Hannibal was a German naval operation involving the evacuation by sea of German troops and civilians from the Courland Pocket, East Prussia, West Prussia and Pomerania from mid-January to May 1945 as the Red Army advanced during the East Prussian and East Pomeranian Offensives and subsidiary operations. The operation was one of the largest evacuations by sea in history.

Operations

The East Prussian Offensive by the Red Army's 3rd Belarusian Front under General Ivan Chernyakhovsky commenced on January 13, 1945 and, with Marshal Konstantin Rokossovsky's 2nd Belorussian Front, subsequently cut off East Prussia between January 23 and February 10, 1945. German Grand Admiral Karl Dönitz ordered General Admiral Oskar Kummetz, as Naval High Commander, Baltic, and Rear Admiral Konrad Engelhardt, head of the Kriegsmarine's shipping department, to plan and execute the Rettungsaktion (evacuation operation). Dönitz radioed a message to Gdynia in occupied Poland on January 23, 1945, to begin evacuations to ports outside of the Soviet area of operations. The operation was codenamed Hannibal.

The flood of military personnel and German civilians eventually turned the operation into one of the largest evacuations by sea in history, even larger than the far more widely known British evacuation of Dunkirk five years earlier. Over a period of 15 weeks, somewhere between 494 and 1,080 merchant vessels of all types, including fishing boats and other craft, and utilizing Germany's largest remaining naval units, carried between 800,000 and 900,000 German civilians and 350,000 soldiers across the Baltic Sea to Germany and German-occupied Denmark. 

Operation Hannibal commenced on January 23, 1945. On January 30, Wilhelm Gustloff, Hansa, and the whaling factory ship Walter Rau left the harbor at Gdynia in occupied Poland, bound for Kiel. Hansa was forced to return to port with mechanical trouble, but the Gustloff, overcrowded with more than 10,000 civilians and military personnel aboard, continued. She was torpedoed and sunk by the Soviet submarine S-13 off the Pomeranian coast, with possibly as many as 9,500 deaths, the largest loss of life in a single ship sinking in history. Those on Walter Rau eventually reached Eckernförde.

On February 9, the SS General von Steuben sailed from Pillau with between 3,000 and 4,000 mostly military personnel on board, heading for Swinemünde. She was also sunk by the S-13, just after midnight, with 650 survivors.

In early March, a task force composed of the German cruiser Admiral Scheer accompanied by three German destroyers and the  Elbing-class torpedo boat  were giving cover to a German bridgehead near Wollin. During that operation, naval small craft evacuated over 75,000 soldiers and civilians who had been isolated in that area. They were taken to larger warships and other transports lying offshore. While a number of these transports were sunk, large liners such as SS Deutschland got through and carried up to 11,000 soldiers and civilians each.

During the night of April 4–5, a flotilla of small boats and landing craft evacuated over 30,000 soldiers and civilians from Oxhöfter Kämpe and took them to Hela. It is estimated that nearly 265,000 people were evacuated from Danzig (modern Gdańsk) to Hela during the month of April alone.

On April 15, another large convoy consisting of four liners and other transports left Hela with over 20,000 soldiers and civilians. On April 16, the Goya was torpedoed and sunk by L-3, with the loss of over 6,000 lives; 183 survived.

Initially, on his becoming Reich President on May 1, Karl Dönitz was determined to continue the war, going so far as to instruct Generaloberst Carl Hilpert that combat troops would have priority in evacuation to Germany from the Courland Pocket. It was not until the afternoon of May 6, with British troops practically on his doorstep, that he gave up on that plan.

From May 1 to May 8, over 150,000 people were evacuated from the beaches of Hela. At 21:00 on May 8, 1945, the last day of the war, a convoy consisting of 92 large and small vessels left the Latvian city of Liepāja with 18,000 soldiers and civilians. While several hundred of those who had boarded small ships on the last day of the war or after were captured by Soviet MTBs, evacuations to the west continued for at least a week after all such movements were prohibited by the terms of the German surrender.

Shortages 
Shortages plagued the operation with food and medicine being seen as primary issues for the Nazi administration, causing a trend of elderly and very young children to die on board the rescue ships. Other shortages included only a three-week supply of coal remaining for the sea transport tasks and only a ten-day supply for rail transports to move troops to the front, with fuel being at its lowest levels since the war began.

Losses
In addition to the Goya, Wilhelm Gustloff, and General von Steuben, 158 other merchant vessels were lost during the 15-week course of Operation Hannibal (January 23 – May 8, 1945).

See also

References

Baltic Sea operations of World War II
Evacuations
Military operations of World War II involving Germany
Naval battles and operations of the European theatre of World War II
January 1945 events in Europe
February 1945 events in Europe
March 1945 events in Europe
April 1945 events in Europe
May 1945 events in Europe